Cheril N. Clarke (born September 24, 1980) is a Canadian-born contemporary author and playwright of gay and lesbian romance, drama and comedy.

Life 
Though born in Toronto, Ontario, Canada, Clarke's family moved to Miami, Florida when she was six months old. She has lived in the United States for the majority of her life.

She is the last of three children born to Hyacinth and Thaddius Clarke.

Creative writing

Books 
Clarke is the author of many books, including novels, collections of erotic vignettes and poetry.

Novels and novelettes 

 Losing Control (2009) 
 Tainted Destiny (2006) 
 Intimate Chaos (2005)

Short stories 

 Corsets & Cognac (2020)
 Sweet Dark Rum  (2020)
 The Edge of Bliss (2017)
 The Beautiful People: South Beach (2014)
 The Beautiful People: New York City (2012)
 The Beautiful People: Las Vegas (2011)
 The Beautiful People: New Orleans (2011)
 Ecstacy (2010)
 Illusions of Love (2010)

Nonfiction 
 Love and Romance: The Gay and Lesbian Guide to Dating and Romance (2010)

Poetry

 Oxygen (2019)

Plays 
Her novel, Intimate Chaos, has been adapted into a play of the same name and has been mounted in Bordentown, New Jersey, Plainfield, New Jersey and twice in Philadelphia, Pennsylvania. Intimate Chaos was translated to Spanish and performed at the Tercer Amor festival in Puerto Rico under the name Caos Intimo.

Clarke's most recent play, Asylum, was the recipient of the Audience Award of the 2012 Downtown Urban Theater Festival  (now known as Downtown Urban Arts Festival) New York and runner-up for best play.

Business and other contributions 
Clarke later founded Phenomenal Writing, LLC, a communications consulting agency that provides ghost and speech writing services for executives around the worlds. Notable clients include General Electric and Cisco Systems.

Clarke has also provided commentary for features on NPR. and WPEB 88.1FM Philadelphia.

References

External links
 Cheril N. Clarke's official website

1980 births
Living people
Canadian women dramatists and playwrights
Writers from Miami
Writers from Toronto
Canadian lesbian writers
Canadian women novelists
American women novelists
American women dramatists and playwrights
Black Canadian writers
African-American novelists
African-American dramatists and playwrights
American dramatists and playwrights
Canadian emigrants to the United States
LGBT African Americans
Canadian LGBT dramatists and playwrights
21st-century American novelists
21st-century Canadian novelists
Canadian LGBT novelists
21st-century Canadian dramatists and playwrights
21st-century Canadian women writers
Black Canadian women
Novelists from Florida
Black Canadian LGBT people
21st-century American women writers
21st-century African-American women writers
21st-century African-American writers
20th-century African-American people
21st-century Canadian LGBT people
20th-century African-American women
American lesbian writers
Lesbian dramatists and playwrights
Lesbian novelists